Killawog is a hamlet in Broome County, New York, United States. Killawog has a post office with ZIP code 13794.

References

Hamlets in Broome County, New York
Hamlets in New York (state)